Larry Williams Jr. (born January 12, 1985) is a former American football defensive back. He played college football for the University of West Virginia. He was signed as a free agent by the Green Bay Blizzard in 2009.

Professional career

Green Bay Blizzard
After going undrafted in the 2008 NFL Draft, Williams signed as an undrafted free agent with the Green Bay Blizzard of af2. Williams played in 12 games with the Blizzard where he played defensive back and return kicks.

Milwaukee Iron
In 2010, Williams signed with the Milwaukee Iron as they transitioned into Arena Football 1. The move re-united Williams with Bob Landsee, who coached the Blizzard in 2009.

Richmond Raiders
In 2011, Williams joined the Richmond Raiders, an expansion team in the Southern Indoor Football League (SIFL). On the very first play of the season, Williams returned the opening kickoff for a touchdown. Williams has played with the Raiders since 2011.

Lehigh Valley Steelhawks
Williams signed with the Lehigh Valley Steelhawks on October 9, 2014. He was waived on March 17, 2015.

References

External links
 West Virginia Bio

1985 births
Living people
American football defensive backs
West Virginia Mountaineers football players
Green Bay Blizzard players
Milwaukee Iron players
Richmond Raiders players
Lehigh Valley Steelhawks players
People from Highland Springs, Virginia